L'Arbre de Noël  (internationally released as The Christmas Tree) is a 1969 French drama film directed by Terence Young. It was defined as "the most tearful film of sixties". The film was co-produced by Italy where it was released as L'albero di Natale.

Plot
The story follows a Frenchman named Laurent and his son Pascal, who live somewhere in France. Along the way, the widower Laurent meets and falls for the beautiful Catherine, but also learns that his son is dying after witnessing the explosion of a plane with a nuclear device inside. Finding this out, Laurent and Pascal have a string of adventures with Catherine along.

Cast 
 William Holden as Laurent Ségur
 Virna Lisi as Catherine Graziani
 Bourvil as Verdun 
 Brook Fuller  as Pascal Ségur
 Mario Feliciani as  Paris doctor
 Madeleine Damien as Marinette
 Friedrich von Ledebur as Vernet
 Georges Douking as Pet owner
 Jean-Pierre Castaldi as The motorcycle policeman 
 Yves Barsacq as Charlie Lebreto

See also
 List of Christmas films

References

External links

1969 films
1960s Christmas drama films
1960s Christmas films
English-language French films
English-language Italian films
Films shot in Corsica
Films set in Corsica
Films directed by Terence Young
Films scored by Georges Auric
Films produced by Robert Dorfmann
Films about death
Films about aviation accidents or incidents
Films set in France
French Christmas drama films
1960s French-language films
1960s French films